NHL Hitz Pro is an ice hockey video game developed by Next Level Games and published by Midway Games, in the NHL Hitz series. It was released on September 25, 2003, for the PlayStation 2, GameCube, and Xbox. Unlike the previous titles in the series, it has 5-on-5 gameplay instead of the usual 3-on-3 gameplay with the earlier titles. The game does not include penalty shots, and it is still an arcade-type hockey game like its predecessors. It also has a lot of hard hitting. The cover athlete of the game is Nicklas Lidström, and features commentary from Tim Kitzrow and Harry Teinowitz.

NHL Hitz Pro had the IIHF license, enabling it to use the jerseys of the Olympic hockey teams.

The game also has many game modes, one of the most popular being the "Pick-Up Hockey" game mode, where the game would turn into either a roller, street, or pond hockey match-up between two amateur teams.

Features
NHL Hitz Pro features NHL-style gameplay for the first time, and although arcade-like features pop up from time to time, the game is far more realistic than the previous titles in the series. Among the changes to Hitz Pro are 5-on-5 gameplay, as opposed to the 3-on-3 action seen in NHL Hitz 2002 and 2003, less exaggerated player appearances and wrap arounds.

Reception

NHL Hitz Pro received "favorable" reviews on all platforms according to the review aggregation website Metacritic.

References

External links

2003 video games
GameCube games
Midway video games
National Hockey League video games
PlayStation 2 games
Video games developed in Canada
Xbox games
Next Level Games games
Multiplayer and single-player video games